The John and Lavina Bangs House is an historic structure located near New London, Iowa, United States.  John Bangs was a successful farmer and this is the second house he built on his property.  A large Italianate style house on a farm, while not unheard of, was somewhat of a rarity.  It is possible that the high-style was chosen, and its location on a major roadway, may indicate the owner's desire to communicate his own or the area's passage from its pioneer origins to a more cultured reality.  The house was listed on the National Register of Historic Places in 2003.

References

Houses completed in 1865
Italianate architecture in Iowa
Houses in Henry County, Iowa
National Register of Historic Places in Henry County, Iowa
Houses on the National Register of Historic Places in Iowa